"Star of All Planets" is the second single by Canadian Idol first season winner Ryan Malcolm from his album Home.

References 

2003 singles